Severe Cyclonic Storm Phethai was a tropical cyclone which affected some portions of Sri Lanka and India during December 2018. The fourteenth depression, ninth deep depression, seventh cyclonic storm, and fifth severe cyclonic storm of the 2018 North Indian Ocean cyclone season, Phethai developed from an area of low pressure that formed over the Bay of Bengal on December 13. Having forecasted not to develop significantly, the depression then strengthened to a deep depression later that day before becoming a cyclonic storm on December 15. Phethai further intensified and peaked to a severe cyclonic storm, the following day. The system then steadily weakened due to land interaction and increasing wind shear, before making landfall as a disorganized system over Andhra Pradesh on December 17. It degenerated to an area of low-pressure inland, the next day.

Phethai caused over eight fatalities during its path towards East India. Some rice crops and paddies were destroyed and flooded, while over 31,600 individuals were evacuated to different centers in Godavari District and Odisha. The total damages from the cyclone were finalized at $100 million (2018 USD).

Meteorological history

At 06:00 UTC on December 7, the India Meteorological Department (IMD) began to note in their bulletins that an area of low-pressure could significantly form over the Bay of Bengal over the next 48 hours. The American-based Joint Typhoon Warning Center (JTWC) also began to monitor the developing system later that day. The IMD later reported that a low-pressure area had formed over the Bay of Bengal, influenced by a trough of low pressure, at 12:00 UTC on December 9. The agency noted that conditions would be favorable for the system to develop further, due to the Madden–Julian oscillation phase being at a three. Over the next couple of days, the low-pressure area produced moderate to deep convection, with the IMD designating the system as a well—marked low-pressure area on December 11. At the same time, the JTWC issued a Tropical Cyclone Formation Alert (TCFA) on the system.

The depression moved north-northwestward towards the coast of India for the next few days, being steered by an anticyclone over Southeast Asia. Deep convection associated with the system began to increase, while global prediction models suggested further strengthening. The JTWC released their first warning on the depression at 6:00 UTC on December 15. The storm changed little in appearance over the next 26 hours, before being upgraded into a severe cyclonic storm, at 17:30 UTC the next day. The cyclone then maintained this intensity for over 12 hours before weakening due to increasing wind shear. By 6:00 UTC on December 17, the structure of the storm began to disorganize, with the center becoming ill-defined. Shortly afterwards, Phethai moved onshore in Andhra Pradesh, near the town of Yanam, just a few hours later.

Just an hour later, the JTWC issued their final warning on Phethai, while it was located just off the coast of Eastern India. The IMD soon reported that the cyclone had weakened into a deep depression, inland over Andhra Pradesh, at 15:00 UTC that same day. The depression remained disorganized as it moved across Eastern India, making a second landfall in the country near Tuni. Phethai continued to weaken inland, being downgraded into a depression by 19:30 UTC that day. The IMD issued their final bulletin on the depression at 3:00 UTC the following day, as it degenerated into an area of low pressure over the northwestern Bay of Bengal, while producing minimal convection. Although, dissipation was later corrected to 0:00 UTC.

Preparations

Cyclone Phethai affected areas still recovering from the impacts of cyclones Daye, Titli, and Gaja. Ahead of the storm, boats were prohibited from leaving port with fishing activities halted.

Roughly 10 shelters were opened within Andhra Pradesh. Over 2,000 electrical workers were assembled to help restore power in Phethai's aftermath. Police and firefighters formed special crews to help with debris removal from streets. Firefighters also prepared boats and lifejackets, with the National Disaster Response Force and State Disaster Response Force assembling seven rescue teams. Marketing departments arranged vegetables and necessities to provide to people staying at shelters. The Indian Coast Guard kept ships and aircraft along the country's east coast to help with aid efforts following the cyclone.

Over 10,000 people prepared for disaster response as the storm neared. Numerous flights heading to Visakhapatnam were cancelled, with trains being halted. N. Chandrababu Naidu, the chief minister of Andhra Pradesh, hosted a teleconference with the collector's of four districts in the state, where cyclone preparations were planned and discussed. Paddy crops were attempted to be saved by farmers in the Krishna and Godavari river deltas. Roughly 20,000 people were evacuated ahead of the cyclone in the nearby Godavari District. Within Krishna district, 68 relief centers, 15 health teams, and 155 firefighters were put on standby, as local officials prepared for the storm. The Rural Water Supply setup 3 water tankers in each of the district's villages, while also producing more than 500 sandbags. Machinery was also readied  to help clear downed trees. While electrical departments ordered crews to be stationed every 6 miles (10 km), to quickly restore power.

In Odisha, roughly 11,600 residents were evacuated from the Gajapati district. These residents were evacuated due to the damage remaining from Cyclone Titli, just two months previously. Farmers in the state were asked to take measures to protect their crops from the results of heavy rainfall. The India Meteorological Department (IMD) warned of a chance of heavy rains in the northern part of Tamil Nadu.

Some fishing communities were advised to exercise cautions when fishing from Trincomalee to Mannar via Kankesanthurai in Sri Lanka. Gusty winds and some squally rainfall were also expected in these areas.

Impact

Showers and thunderstorms associated with Phethai affected Sri Lanka during its development. After moving onshore, Phethai brought torrential rainfall and strong winds in Andhra Pradesh which downed trees and electrical lines. A peak precipitation accumulation of 156.5 mm (6.16 in) was reported in the city of Ninnimamidivalasa in Visakhapatnam, while the village of Pachipenta recorded a rainfall amount of 136 mm. During the storm, seven fishermen went missing offshore the city.

A 40-year-old man was killed after a boulder crashed through his roof in Vijayawada. Another man in the city was hurtled down a small hill due to heavy rainfall, killing him. A 68-year-old woman was also killed in Pallepalem. In the East Godavari district, streets in more than 50 locations were left impassible but were quickly cleared. Power outages were reported in 99 villages within the district.

In the town of Amalapuram, a rare phenomenon of fish rain was reported along a canal on December 17. A video of the incident went viral on social media, showing more than 100 bodies of fish on land near the canal. A possible cause of this occurrence was high wind bringing the bodies of fish and frogs onshore.

Aftermath
Following the cyclone, the Government of Odisha began to assess damage to crops in the state. Some assistance would be given to the farmers regarding the major damages to rice paddies from the aftermath of the cyclone.

See also

Tropical cyclones in 2018
Cyclone Fani (2019) — affected similar areas in May 2019.

References

External links

2018 in India
2018 North Indian Ocean cyclone season
Severe cyclonic storms
December 2018 events in Asia
Tropical cyclones in India
Tropical cyclones in 2018
2018 in Sri Lanka